Premabhishekam  is a 1981 Indian Telugu-language romantic drama film written and directed by Dasari Narayana Rao. Produced by Venkat Akkineni and Nagarjuna Akkineni under Annapurna Studios banner, the film stars Akkineni Nageswara Rao, Jayasudha, Sridevi, Murali Mohan and Mohan Babu with music composed by Chakravarthy.

Released on 18 February 1981, Premabhishekam was a commercial success and industry hit grossing over 4crore at the box office. It had a theatrical run of 527 days and became the first film to complete a 75-week run in Andhra Pradesh. The film won four Nandi Awards and two Filmfare Awards South. It was later remade in Tamil as Vazhvey Maayam, in Hindi as Prem Tapasya and in Oriya as Prathama Prema.

Plot
Rajesh (Akkineni Nageswara Rao) falls for Devi (Sridevi). Through a series of misunderstandings, they frequently quarrel. Devi rejects his proposal and humiliates him. She later changes her mind about him and they become a couple. Their respective families agree to this and arrange their marriage. A few days before the wedding, Devi's brother Dr. Chakravarthy (Mohan Babu) finds out that Rajesh is terminally ill with cancer. He attempts to stop the wedding. Rajesh and Devi plan to get married secretly. But before that can happen, Rajesh also learns of his illness from Dr. Venkateswarulu (Gummadi). He finds out that his close friend Prasad (Murali Mohan) also loves Devi. He decides to make her hate him by pretending to be indifferent to her. He associates with a prostitute Jayanthi (Jayasudha) to make Devi hate him. Devi tries to contact him but gets shocked by his behavior. Rajesh calls off the wedding and pretends that his marriage proposal was just a ploy to get revenge on Devi who had humiliated him many times. Devi gets angry and urges her brother to get her married to Prasad to humiliate the arrogant Rajesh. Jayanthi asks Rajesh to marry her as she wants to live as a wife, not a prostitute, even if for a short while. Rajesh marries her. Soon after her wedding, Devi learns the truth and rushes to meet Rajesh. Rajesh blesses the newly wedded couple and breathes his last, happily.

Cast
Akkineni Nageswara Rao as Rajesh
Sridevi as Devi 
Jayasudha as Jayanthi
Murali Mohan as Prasad 
Mohan Babu as Dr. Chakravarthy 
Gummadi as Dr. Venkateswarulu
Prabhakar Reddy as Satya Murthy 
Padmanabham
Eeswara Rao
Raja
Pushpalata as Lakshmi
Kavitha as Kalpana
Nirmalamma
Master Harish

Production
Dasari Narayana Rao wrote the story, screenplay, and dialogues in addition to lyrics. The film has editing by B. Krishnam Raju and cinematography by P. S. Selvaraj. Nageswara Rao's sons, Venkat Akkineni and Nagarjuna Akkineni produced the film under Annapurna Studios.

Soundtrack

Music composed by Chakravarthy. Lyrics were written by Dasari Narayana Rao. Music released on SEA Records Audio Company. The song "Nee Kallu" was reused in the film's Tamil remake Vaazhvey Maayam as "Mazhaikaala Megam".

Box office
The film has completed 100 days direct in 25 centres. The film has completed 175 days direct in 16 centres and also ran for 365 days in some theatres in Telugu states

Awards
Nandi Awards
Best Actress - Jayasudha
Best Male Playback Singer - S. P. Balasubrahmanyam
Best Art Director - Bhaskar Raju
Special Jury Award - Dasari Narayana Rao

Filmfare Awards South
Filmfare Award for Best Director - Telugu - Dasari Narayana Rao - Won
Filmfare Special Jury Award - Jayasudha -Won 
Filmfare Award for Best Actress – Telugu - Jayasudha - Nominated
Filmfare Award for Best Actress – Telugu - Sridevi - Nominated

References

External links
 

1981 films
Indian romantic drama films
Films scored by K. Chakravarthy
Films directed by Dasari Narayana Rao
Telugu films remade in other languages
1980s Telugu-language films
1981 romantic drama films